Mazwandi bin Zekeria (born 24 June 1989 in Sarawak) is a Malaysian footballer currently playing for Kuching in the Malaysia M3 League as a defender.

Career
Mazwandi was born in Kuching, Sarawak, Malaysia. He attended Bukit Jalil Sport School before playing for Sarawak President Cup team. He started his career with Polis Di-Raja Malaysia in 2008. After just one season playing for team, he joined his state team Sarawak.

Honours

Clubs
Sarawak
 Liga Premier: 2013

References

External links
 Profile at Goal.com
 

Malaysian footballers
1989 births
Living people
People from Kuching
People from Sarawak
PDRM FA players
Sarawak FA players
Kuching City F.C. players
Malaysia Premier League players
Malaysia Super League players
Association football defenders